Coleophora prepostera is a moth of the family Coleophoridae. It is found in the United States, including Montana.

References

prepostera
Moths of North America
Moths described in 1923